Edward Grover "Bud" Chandler (26 September 1905 — 2 July 1996) was an American tennis player.

Chandler, raised in Berkeley, California, was a two-time state singles champion and played collegiate tennis for UC Berkeley. He won back to back national intercollegiate singles titles in 1925 and 1926.

Graduating from college in 1926, Chandler competed briefly on tour and was ranked as high as fifth in the country. In 1929 he featured at Wimbledon for the only time and despite a first round exit was still able to win a trophy by claiming the All England Plate. He is a member of the Northern California Tennis Hall of Fame.

Chandler was a graduate of Harvard Law School and practiced as an attorney after leaving tennis.

References

External links
 

1905 births
1996 deaths
American male tennis players
California Golden Bears men's tennis players
Harvard Law School alumni
Tennis people from California
Sportspeople from Berkeley, California